Jeon Kyung-Jun (born 10 September 1973) is a former footballer from South Korea. He played as midfielder and was the head coach of the Super Reds FC in the Singapore S.League.

Jeon has represented South Korea both at the youth (U-20) and Olympic (U-23) levels.

At club level, he initially enjoyed more international successes (winning the Asian Champions Cup in 1997 and 1998 with Pohang Steelers) than domestic ones. However, Jeonbuk Hyundai Motors did manage to win two FA Cups (2003, 2005) despite average form in the league.

In 2006, Jeon left Jeonbuk to play for Home United in Singapore. It was not seen as a wise choice as Jeonbuk won the AFC Champions League that year, while the Protectors only managed a fourth-placed finish in the S.League, but Jeon scored 13 goals.

He joined the Bruneian club DPMM FC for the 2007 Malaysian Super League season, but only stayed a year before returning to Singapore as a player-coach for the Super Reds. He successfully led the team to an impressive runners-up finish in the 2008 season, two points below champions SAFFC, and barely missed out on the MIKASA Coach of the Year award at the S.League Awards Night.

Under Jeon, the Super Reds have been known to play a brand of quick-paced football with effective short passes.

In 2019, he replaced Fabiano as manager of Jeonnam Dragons in K League 2. He has resigned from the position on 5 June 2022.

Club career 
1993–1999 Pohang Steelers
1999–2001 Bucheon SK
2002–2005 Jeonbuk Hyundai Motors
2006 Home United
2007 DPMM FC

References

External links
 
 FIFA Player Statistics

1973 births
Living people
Association football midfielders
South Korean footballers
South Korean expatriate footballers
South Korea international footballers
South Korean football managers
Pohang Steelers players
Jeju United FC players
Jeonbuk Hyundai Motors players
Home United FC players
K League 1 players
Singapore Premier League players
South Korean expatriate sportspeople in Singapore
Expatriate footballers in Singapore
South Korean expatriate sportspeople in Brunei
Expatriate footballers in Brunei
DPMM FC players
Footballers from Seoul